A minaret is an architectural feature of Islamic mosques.

Minarets may also refer to:
Minarets, California, a former town in California
Minarets (California), mountain peaks in the Sierra Nevada Mountains of California
"Minarets," a song by Dave Matthews Band on their 1993 album Remember Two Things
The Minarets (New Zealand), mountain peaks in New Zealand's South Island

See also
Minaret (disambiguation)